Justin Alves Vierira (April 16, 1925 – February 9, 2002), nicknamed "Chris" and also known as "Justin Joseph Lópes", was an American Negro league outfielder in the 1940s.

A native of Rye, New York, Vieriria played for the New York Black Yankees in 1948. He died in New Britain, Connecticut in 2002 at age 76.

References

External links
 and Seamheads

1925 births
2002 deaths
New York Black Yankees players
Baseball outfielders
Baseball players from New York (state)
People from Rye, New York
20th-century African-American sportspeople
21st-century African-American people